Basin Bridge was an assembly constituency in Tamil Nadu. The elections conducted in the constituency and winners are listed below.

Members of Legislative Assembly

Election results

1971

1967

1962

1957

References

External links
 

Former assembly constituencies of Tamil Nadu